The 2017 Phoenix Rising FC season is the club's fourth season of United Soccer League play and the first under a new name and ownership.

Friendlies 
All times from this point are on Mountain Standard Time (UTC−07:00)

USL

Results summary

League results

USL Playoffs

Western Conference standings

U.S. Open Cup

Statistics
(regular-season & Playoffs)

Goalkeepers

Transfers

Loan in

See also 
 2017 in American soccer
 2017 USL season
 Phoenix Rising FC

References 

2017
Phoenix Rising FC
Phoenix Rising FC
Phoenix Rising FC
Phoenix Rising FC